Wellston is a town in Lincoln County, Oklahoma, United States. The population was 788 at the 2010 census.

History 

Wellston was named by Christian T. Wells, who established a trading post on the site in 1883. The post office officially opened September 19, 1884.

The trading post closed during the allotment of the Kickapoo Reserve. Following the Run of 95, the post office reopened June 15, 1897.

Geography
Wellston is located at  (35.690863, -97.063185).

Demographics

As of the census of 2000, there were 825 people, 338 households, and 225 families residing in the town. There were 380 housing units at an average density of 280.3 per square mile (107.9/km2). The racial makeup of the town was 86.67% White, 5.58% African American, 2.91% Native American, 0.48% from other races, and 4.36% from two or more races. Hispanic or Latino of any race were 2.42% of the population.

There were 338 households, out of which 36.4% had children under the age of 18 living with them, 48.5% were married couples living together, 14.8% had a female householder with no husband present, and 33.4% were non-families. 29.9% of all households were made up of individuals, and 13.3% had someone living alone who was 65 years of age or older. The average household size was 2.44 and the average family size was 3.05.

In the town, the population was spread out, with 30.3% under the age of 18, 8.6% from 18 to 24, 28.4% from 25 to 44, 19.5% from 45 to 64, and 13.2% who were 65 years of age or older. The median age was 33 years. For every 100 females, there were 95.0 males. For every 100 females age 18 and over, there were 87.3 males.

The median income for a household in the town was $28,553, and the median income for a family was $33,906. Males had a median income of $24,911 versus $20,000 for females. The per capita income for the town was $14,052. About 12.2% of families and 13.7% of the population were below the poverty line, including 18.0% of those under age 18 and 16.7% of those age 65 or over.

Sources
Shirk, George H.; Oklahoma Place Names; University of Oklahoma Press; Norman, Oklahoma; 1987:  .

References

External links

Oklahoma City metropolitan area
Towns in Lincoln County, Oklahoma
Towns in Oklahoma